Bell is a town in Gilchrist County, Florida, United States. The population was 456 at the 2010 census, up from 349 in 2000. It is situated in the northern part of the county. The middle/high school is home to approximately 750 students.

History
The town was founded in the 1890s, named after a beauty contest winner, Bell Fletcher. In the early 1900s, a railway was built, passing through the town on its route between Starke and Wannee. A train depot was built circa 1905, and the restored depot building is now the Town Hall.

On September 18, 2014, a 51-year-old ex-convict, Don Charles Spirit, shot and murdered his daughter Sarah and her six children. He then committed suicide after police officers responded to the scene of the crime.

Geography

Bell is located at  (29.754443, –82.861712). U.S. Route 129 is the town's Main Street; it leads north  to Branford and south  to Trenton, the Gilchrist County seat.

Climate

Demographics

As of the census of 2000, there were 349 people, 125 households, and 91 families residing in the town. The racial makeup of the town was 95.99% White, 2.01% African American, 0.29% Native American, 1.43% from other races, and 0.29% from two or more races. Hispanic or Latino of any race were 1.43% of the population.

There were 125 households, out of which 43.2% had children under the age of 18 living with them, 52.0% were married couples living together, 16.8% had a female householder with no husband present, and 26.4% were non-families. 21.6% of all households were made up of individuals, and 10.4% had someone living alone who was 65 years of age or older.  The average household size was 2.79 and the average family size was 3.21.

In the town, the population was spread out, with 30.4% under the age of 18, 10.0% from 18 to 24, 28.7% from 25 to 44, 16.6% from 45 to 64, and 14.3% who were 65 years of age or older.  The median age was 34 years. For every 100 females, there were 90.7 males.  For every 100 females age 18 and over, there were 84.1 males.

The median income for a household in the town was $30,156, and the median income for a family was $30,987. Males had a median income of $21,250 versus $23,125 for females. The per capita income for the town was $11,790.  About 13.1% of families and 17.2% of the population were below the poverty line, including 19.4% of those under age 18 and 5.9% of those age 65.

Education
There are several schools that serve the Bell area and are, in turn, served by the Gilchrist County School District.
These schools include:
Bell Elementary
Bell Middle/High School

References

External links 
Town of Bell official website

Towns in Gilchrist County, Florida
Gainesville metropolitan area, Florida
Towns in Florida
Populated places established in the 1890s